Góra Świętej Małgorzaty ("St. Margaret's Mountain") is a village in Łęczyca County, Łódź Voivodeship, in central Poland. It is the seat of the gmina (administrative district) called Gmina Góra Świętej Małgorzaty.

References

Villages in Łęczyca County